Pattathu Raani is a 1992 Tamil-language comedy film directed by Manivasagam. The film stars Vijayakumar and Gautami leading an ensemble cast including Manorama, Goundamani, Janagaraj, Senthil, Delhi Ganesh and Manivasagam. It was released on 14 August 1992.

Plot 

Jalagandeswaran and Rayappan are brothers and house owners of a small colony. The tenants refused to pay up their rents, knowing that the houses were built on State land. Rayappan has the idea to rent a vacant house to Usha, a beautiful company manageress. Usha is married to a middle-aged man Sundaram. The couple moves into their new house and befriends the neighbours. The married neighbours Jalagandeswaran, Viswanathan, Ganesan and Coimbatore fall in love with the beautiful Usha. They begin to woo the young woman. What transpires later forms the crux of the story.

Cast 

Vijayakumar as Sundaram
Gautami as Usha
Manorama as Muniamma
Goundamani as Jalagandeswaran
Janagaraj as Viswanathan
Senthil as Rayappan
Delhi Ganesh as Ganesan
E V Velu as Coimbatore
Sethu Vinayagam
Vijayaraj as Nagaraj
Vadivukkarasi as Yamuna
Kovai Sarala as Savitri
Vasuki as Mami
Deepa
Mahesh as Ramakrishnan
Mythili as Shanthi
Idichapuli Selvaraj
Karuppu Subbiah
Vellai Subbaiah
Thideer Kannaiah
Pasi Sathya
R. Sundarrajan in a guest appearance

Soundtrack 
The music was composed by Deva, with lyrics written by Kalidasan.

Reception 
K. Vijayan of New Straits Times gave the film a mixed review citing "See it with your wife and you probably enjoy it yourself" and described the film as "comedy loses steam midway". The Indian Express praised the artiste's performances and dialogues.

References 

1992 films
Films scored by Deva (composer)
1990s Tamil-language films
Films directed by Manivasagam